is the founder and President of P.A. Works Studio  and the Operations Director for Bee Train Productions Inc.
He was also formerly an employee with Production I.G and Tatsunoko Productions.  In 2000 he founded P.A. Works and currently produces the works produced by the studio.  Horikawa has also worked as a Production Manager and Production Assistant.

Filmography
Another (2012) (Producer and Planning)
Hanasaku Iroha (2011) (Producer)
Mai's Magic and Family Day (2011) (Producer)
Bannō Yasai Ninninman (Producer)
Angel Beats (2010) (Producer)
Professor Layton and the Eternal Diva (2009) (Producer)
Canaan (2009) (Producer)
True Tears (2008) (Producer)
Immortal Grand Prix (2005) (Production Desk for P.A. Works)
Wild Arms 3 (2002) (Animation Producer)
Medabots (1999) (Producer)
Wild Arms: Twilight Venom (1999) (Line Producer)
Popolocrois Story (1998) (Series Composition and Line Producer)Xenogears (1998) (Animation Cut Scene Producer)Jin-Roh: The Wolf Brigade (Line Producer and Production Manager)Panzer Dragoon (1996 OAV) (Production Manager)Neon Genesis Evangelion (Production Manager)

References

External links
 

P.A.Works
Bee Train Production
Japanese anime producers
Japanese animated film producers
Japanese film producers
Living people
People from Kōnan, Aichi
1965 births